The Transnistria Governorate was a Romanian-administered territory between the Dniester and Southern Bug, conquered by the Axis Powers from the Soviet Union during Operation Barbarossa and occupied from 19 August 1941 to 29 January 1944. Limited in the west by the Dniester river (separating it from Bessarabia), in the east by the Southern Bug river (separating it from the German Reichskommissariat Ukraine), and in the south by the Black Sea, it comprised the present-day region of Transnistria (which compared to the World War II whole is only a small strip along the bank of the Dniester) and territories further east (modern Odesa Oblast eastward of the Dniester, southern Vinnytsia Oblast and a small part of eastern Mykolaiv Oblast), including the Black Sea port of Odesa, which became the administrative capital of Transnistria during World War II.

In World War II, the Kingdom of Romania, persuaded and aided by Nazi Germany, took control of Transnistria for the first time in history. In August 1941, Adolf Hitler persuaded Ion Antonescu to take control of the territory as a substitute for Northern Transylvania, occupied by Miklós Horthy's Hungary following the Second Vienna Award. Despite the Romanian administration, the Kingdom of Romania did not formally incorporate Transnistria into its administrative framework; the Nazi-friendly Antonescu government hoped to annex the territory eventually, but developments on the Eastern Front precluded it.

Romanian conquest of Transnistria

Following the Soviet occupation of Bessarabia and Northern Bukovina, a strong concentration of Soviet troops became present on the border with Romania. Nazi Germany wanted Romania as an ally in the war against the Soviet Union for fear that the Soviets were a threat to the Romanian oilfields. Romania in turn aligned their foreign policy with Germany for an assurance against the Soviet Union. With regards to Operation Barbarossa, Antonescu accepted Hitler's ideas that the conflict was a "race war" between the Aryans, represented by the Nordic Germans and Latin Romanians on the Axis side vs. the Slavs and Asians, commanded by the Jews on the Soviet side. Romania in turn committed two armies for the invasion of the Soviet Union, totaling over 300,000 troops between them. For their commitment, Romania was promised Bessarabia, Northern Bukovina and the area between Dniester and Southern Bug.

Siege of Odessa
During the first week of the advance, in mid-August 1941, Romanian forces took over all of the region, except for a small area around Odessa, without a fight. At the time, the Romanians had 60,000 soldiers to conquer the city from its 34,000 defenders. However, the organization was so poor, and the command was so superficial, that the initial assault on the city failed, resulting in a siege. Exploiting this success, the Soviets bolstered the cities defenses with naval marines, warships and paratroopers. Multiple attempts by the Romanian Fourth Army failed and a siege ensured. German forces were brought into the reinforce the attackers and eventually in October 1941 after two months of fighting, the Romanian army took control of the city. Casualties were significant with Romanian losses standing at 90,020 casualties.

Once Romanian troops entered Odessa, they established the headquarters of two of their divisions in the local NKVD building. However, the building was mined by the Soviets, who blew it up, killing over 61 troops, including 16 officers and one general. In reprisal, Ion Antonescu ordered the arrest and massacre of civilians suspected of aiding the Red Army. When it became clear that identifying individuals directly responsible for the incident would be almost impossible, Antonescu ordered the shooting of Jews. The massacre that followed resulted in 100,000 civilians killed, the  majority of whom had nothing to do with the military action. A further number of Odessa Jews were deported to ghettos and concentration camps in the northern half of the region.

A Soviet partisan movement was active in the Odessa catacombs from October 1941 to 1944 with varying levels of activity. Romanian troops attempted to flush the partisans out with chemical weapons and by sealing off as many exits as they could. The catacombs were never completely cleared, however the impact of these partisan movements were not significant.

Status with respect to Romania proper

Albeit not annexing the region outright, the Romanian Antonescu government organized the territory in the Guvernământul Transnistriei under Romanian governor, Gheorghe Alexianu.

The Nazi-allied Antonescu government hoped to annex the territory eventually, but developments on the Eastern Front precluded it.

Romanian opposition parties were against Romanian operations beyond Bessarabia and Bukovina. Two eminent political figures of the day, Iuliu Maniu and Constantin Brătianu, declared that "the Romanian people will never consent to the continuation of the struggle beyond our national borders."

Administrative divisions

The territory was divided into 13 counties (sing. Judeţ). Below these were subdivisions named Municipiu, Oraş and Raion.

Counties 
Ananiev (Ananiv)
Balta (Balta)
Berezovca (Berezivka)
Dubăsari
Golta (Golta)
Jugastru (Yampil)
Movilău (Mohyliv-Podilskyi)
Oceacov (Ochakiv)
Odesa (Odesa)
Ovidiopol (Ovidiopol)
Rîbnița
Tiraspol
Tulcin (Tulchyn)

Raions and towns 
Judeţul Moghilău (Moghilău)
Oraşul Moghilău
Oraşul Şmerinca
Raionul Balchi
Raionul Copaigorod
Raionul Crasnoe
Raionul Iarişev
Raionul Sargorod
Raionul Şmerinca
Raionul Stanislavcic
Judeţul Tulcin (Tulcin)
Oraşul Moghilău
Raionul Şmerinca
Raionul Braslav
Raionul Spicov
Raionul Trostineţ
Raionul Tulcin
Judeţul Jugastru (Iampol)
Oraşul Iampol
Raionul Cernovăţ
Raionul Crijopol
Raionul Iampol
Raionul Tomaspol
Judeţul Balta (Balta)
Oraşul Balta
Oraşul Berşad
Raionul Balta
Raionul Berşad
Raionul Cicelnic
Raionul Obadovca
Raionul Olgopol
Raionul Pesceana
Raionul Savrani
Judeţul Râbniţa (Râbniţa)
Oraşul Bârzula
Oraşul Râbniţa
Raionul Bârzula
Raionul Camenca
Raionul Codâma
Raionul Piesceanca
Raionul Râbniţa
Judeţul Golta (Golta)
Oraşul Golta
Raionul Crivoe-Oziero
Raionul Domaniovca
Raionul Golta
Raionul Liubaşovca
Raionul Vradievca
Judeţul Ananiev (Ananiev)
Oraşul Ananiev
Raionul Ananiev
Raionul Cernova
Raionul Petroverovca
Raionul Sfânta Troiţca
Raionul Siraievo
Raionul Valea Hoţului
Judeţul Dubăsari (Dubăsari)
Oraşul Dubăsari
Oraşul Grigoriopol
Raionul Ciorna
Raionul Dubăsari
Raionul Grigoriopol
Raionul Ocna
Raionul Zaharievca
Judeţul Tiraspol (Tiraspol)
Municipiul Tiraspol
Raionul Grosulova
Raionul Razdelnaia
Raionul Selz
Raionul Slobozia
Raionul Tebricovo
Raionul Tiraspol
Judeţul Ovidiopol (Ovidiopol)
Oraşul Ovidiopol
Raionul Balaevca
Raionul Franzfeld
Raionul Ovidiopol
Raionul Vigoda
Judeţul Odesa (Odesa)
Municipiul Odesa
Raionul Antono-Codincevo
Raionul Blagujevo
Raionul Ianovca
Raionul Odesa
Judeţul Berezovca (Berezovca)
Oraşul Berezovca
Raionul Berezovca
Raionul Landau
Raionul Mostovoi
Raionul Veselinovo
Judeţul Oceacov (Oceacov)
Oraşul Oceacov
Raionul Crasna
Raionul Oceacov
Raionul Varvarovca

Population
In December, 1941 Romanian authorities conducted a census in Transnistria and the ethnic structure was as follows:

Romanian urban population (December, 1941 census)

Romanian population by county (December, 1941 census)

Romanian authorities used Transnistria as an "ethnic dump" for Jews and Roma from other regions of the country. Beginning in June 1942, Romanian authorities deported over 25,000 ethnic Roma from Bessarabia and Romania proper to Transnistria. During this same time period, over 90,000 Jews were deported from Bessarabia to Transnistria.

Organization

Civilian life

The Romanian administration of Transnistria attempted to stabilize the situation in the region during the occupation. To this end, it opened all churches, previously closed down by the Soviets. During 1942–1943, 2,200 primary schools were organized in the region, including 1,677 Ukrainian, 311 Romanian, 150 Russian, 70 German, and 6 Bulgarian. 117 middle and high schools were opened, including 65 middle schools, 29 technical high schools, and 23 academic high schools. Theaters were opened in Odessa and Tiraspol, as well as several museums, libraries, and cinemas throughout the region. On 7 December 1941, the University of Odessa was reopened with 6 faculties - medicine, polytechnical, law, sciences, languages and agricultural engineering.

The Romanian policy of security during 1942 - 1943 was successful in keeping Transnistria pacified. The ruthless methods applied by the Germans elsewhere were less successful, as evidenced by the attempts of refugees to escape from German to Romanian jurisdiction. Romanian policies in Transnistria amounted to the best food, health and education situation within Axis-occupied Eastern Europe. Under Romanian rule, religious and cultural revivals were permitted, prisoners of war were released and many local Communists were amnestied. This leniency eased local hostility to Romanian occupation after the terror of 1941, also undermining Soviet attempts to recruit partisans. Even while the retreating Romanians were looting Transnistria in March 1944, the local partisans were unable to mobilize civilian support.

Orthodox churches of Transnistria fell into the jurisdiction of the Romanian Orthodox Church. Under the leadership of Metropolitan bishop Visarion Puiu, the Romanian Orthodox Church in addition to opening all churches closed by Soviet authorities, set up three hundred new churches across Transnistria. Romanian clergy removed all Church Slavonic material and implemented the revised Julian calendar.

Economy

The uncertain political status of Transnistria throughout the Romanian occupation meant no clear economic policy was implemented across Transnistria. In addition to the looting of industrial and agricultural resources, Transnistria served as a colony for cheap labor to be used in mines and to rebuild destroyed infrastructure.

Borders, territory, and administrative hierarchy
On 14 August 1941, Hitler wrote to Antonescu, asking the latter to take over the administration between the Dniester and the Dnieper. Antonescu replied three days later, stating that he could only assume responsibility for the area between the Dniester and the Bug, due to lacking "the means and trained staff". The Romanian leader was however willing to supply security troops for the area between the Bug and the Dnieper. The German-Romanian agreement for the creation of Transnistria was signed on 19 August, at Tiraspol. It is known as the Tiraspol Agreement. This treaty was consolidated by a convention signed at Tighina on 30 August (the Tighina Agreement), which however did not clearly define the northern borders of Transnistria. Antonescu claimed the northern towns of Mohyliv-Podilskyi, Zhmerynka and Tulchyn, a request to which Hitler acceded. The final borders were recognized on 4 September, in a German order establishing a boundary between Transnistria and the rear of Army Group South. It was divided into 13 counties, each ruled by a high-ranking officer with the role of prefect. A county was further divided into raions, each raion being ruled by a praetor, who had much broader powers than the prefect. The entire region, forming a single Governorate, was led by one Governor, Gheorghe Alexianu.

Air section

Transnistria had budgetary autonomy and as such made use of its own aircraft, separate from the rest of the Royal Romanian Air Force. The following aircraft comprised the Transnistrian air section:

The Holocaust
Responsibility for the Holocaust in Odessa and Transnistria at large was squarely Romania's, the only country aside from Nazi Germany to administer a major Soviet city during World War II. Odessa - at the time, one of the greatest centers of Jewish life and culture in Europe - had been rendered virtually judenrein, despite its population being one third Jewish at the start of World War II.

Many Jews were deported to Transnistria from Bessarabia and Bukovina. During the period 1941–1944, 200,000 Romani people and Jews became victims of the Romanian occupation of Transnistria. Not being Romanian territory, Transnistria was used as a killing field for the extermination of Jews. Survivors say that in comparison with the Holocaust of Nazi Germany, where deportations were carefully planned, the Romanian government did not prepare to house thousands of people in Transnistria, where the deportees stayed. The people were instead placed in crude barracks without running water, electricity or latrines. Those who could not walk were simply left to die. In total, around 150 ghettos and camps functioned in Transnistria. 

In Odessa, between 80,000 and 90,000 of the city's roughly 180,000 Jews remained at the time the Germans and Romanians captured the city on October 16, 1941. Six days later, a bomb exploded in the Romanian military headquarters in Odessa, prompting a massacre of Jews; many were burned alive. In October and November 1941 alone, Romanian troops in Odessa killed about 30,000 Jews. Transnistria was the site of two concentration camps and several de facto ghettos (which the Romanian wartime government referred to as "colonies"). In addition, most of the remaining Jews in Bessarabia (84,000 of 105,000) and northern Bukovina (36,000 of 60,000) were herded into these as well. A striking paradox is the fact that most of Romanian Jews (375,000) under Antonescu regime survived WW2. The Holocaust Encyclopedia (United States Holocaust Memorial Museum) writes that "Among the most notorious of these ghettos… was Bogdanovka, on the west bank of the Bug River… In December 1941, Romanian troops, together with Ukrainian auxiliaries, massacred almost all the Jews in Bogdanovka; shootings continued for more than a week." Similar events occurred at the Domanevka and Akhmetchetkha camps, and (quoting the same source) "typhus-devastated Jews were crowded into the 'colony' in Mohyliv-Podilskyi." Other camps, also with very high death rates, were at Pechora and Vapniarka, the latter reserved for Jewish political prisoners deported from Romania proper. Many Jews died of exposure, starvation, or disease during the deportations to Transnistria or after arrival. Others were murdered by Romanian or German units, either in Transnistria or after being driven across the Bug River into the German-occupied Ukraine. Most of the Jews who were sent to the camps in Transnistria never returned. Those who survived, around 70,000, returned to Romania in 1945 to find that they had lost their houses.

Even for the general population, food in Transnistria was very scarce, through lack of Romanian planning. According to one survivor's account, people would gather outside a slaughterhouse and wait for scraps of meat, skin and bones to be thrown out of the slaughterhouse after the cleaning each morning. He remembers that they were fighting for the bones "just like dogs would" and that people were starving to death.  Among the survivors were Liviu Librescu and Norman Manea.

Position of Antonescu government

Antonescu, in a government meeting showed intentions to deport all Jews behind the Ural Mountains if it would be possible: "I have about 10,000 Jews left in Bessarabia, who in a few days will be taken across the Dniester, and if circumstances will allow, they will be taken beyond the Urals".

End of Transnistria Governorate

By early 1944, the Romanian economy was in tatters because of the expenses of the war, and destructive Allied air bombing throughout Romania, including the capital, Bucharest. In addition, most of the products sent to Germany were provided without monetary compensation. As a result of  these "uncompensated exports", inflation in Romania skyrocketed, causing widespread discontent among the Romanian population, even among groups and individuals who had once enthusiastically supported the Germans and the war.

Transnistria was relatively spared by these air bombings, but soon the Red Army destroyed all the Romanian presence in the region. During the Uman–Botoşani Offensive the Soviet troops crossed the higher Bug river on March 11 and in twenty days more the Transnistria Governorate "disappeared". By the end of March 1944 there were no more Axis troops east of the Dniester river, save for the encircled capital Odessa. Meanwhile, the replacement of Governor Alexianu happened on February 1, 1944, by the military governor, Lt General Potopeanu (formerly Romanian Economy Minister). The name Transnistria dropped out of use, and the authorities were increasingly referred to as Military Government between Dniester and Bug.

On March 28, the Red Army took Nikolaev and the next day crossed the lower Bug river in force. On April 5, Razdelnaia fell, and therewith the Odessa-Tiraspol highway was cut. On the 19th, after a brief but bitter fight, the Red Army re-entered Odessa. On the April 12, Tiraspol was occupied, and four days later all Transnistria was again in Soviet hands. 
During the final days, the Germans concentrated on destruction in Odessa, since evacuation was impossible. Port installations, some industrial facilities, and transportation junctions were blown up (even the electric power plant, various mills, stores of bread, sugar, and other foods were destroyed). Of Odessa's population, scarcely 200,000 remained; many had hidden in the vicinity while some had sought safety in the countryside. And some had left westward with the Romanians and Germans: only those most compromised had left; the bulk of the residents had stayed in the region. People feared Soviet repressions, but "there was no other way out", according to German sources. It is worth noting however, that there was still a very small piece of Transnistrian territory still left under Romanian rule as late as August 1944, according to an OKH map depicting the situation on the Romanian front as of 20 August. This area comprised a Westwards salient created by the Dniester river, centered around Coșnița (today part of the  Dubăsari District of the Republic of Moldova).

Reduction of the Transnistria neo-Latin population

Today east of the Dniester there are only 237,785 Romance-speaking residents left, a small percentage of the overall population of the region, most of whom live in the actual Transnistria break-away republic. But historically they were the majority: according to the results of the Russian census (quoted in Romanian sources) of 1793, 49 villages out of 67 between the Dniester and the Southern Bug were Romanian.

And further east of the Transnistria Governorate there were many neo-Latin communities: indeed the Romanians/Moldavians in Ukraine - east of the Bug river - were calculated by a German census to be nearly 780.000 (probably an excessive number), and were made plans to move them to Transnistria in 1942/43. But nothing was done.

Indeed, when the Soviet Union regained the area in spring 1944, and the Soviet Army advanced into the territory driving out the Axis forces, many thousands of Romanians/Vlachs of Transnistria were killed in those months and deported to gulags in the following years. So, a political campaign was directed towards the rich Moldavian peasant families, which were deported to Kazakhstan and Siberia as well. For instance, in just two days, July 6 and July 7, 1949, over 11,342 Moldavian families (more than 40,000 inhabitants of Ukraine Oblasts) were deported by the order of the Minister of State Security, I. L. Mordovets, under a plan named "Operation South".

The Census statistics for Romance-speaking population in territories east of the Dniester river are the following:

 1939: 230.698 (according to the 1939 Soviet census), of which 170.982 in the Moldavian ASSR and 26.730 in Odessa Oblast.
 1941: 197,685 inside Transnistria Governorate
 2001: 307,785  (177,785 living in actual Transnistria zone + 60,000 living in Odessa Oblast + 70,000 living in the rest of Ukraine)

See also 
 Administrative divisions of the Kingdom of Romania (1941–1944)
 Bessarabia Governorate (Romania)
 Bukovina Governorate
 Demographic history of Transnistria
 Soviet occupation of Bessarabia and Northern Bukovina
 Dnieper–Carpathian Offensive
 History of Transnistria
 History of Romania
 Romania in World War II
 Siege of Odessa (1941)
 Naval operations in Romanian-occupied Soviet waters
 Tatarka common graves

Notes and references

External links
 Rumania in World War II, 1939-1945, World History at KMLA. Accessed 11 November 2007.
  I. Altman  ("Chapter 3: Ghettoes and Camps on the territory of the USSR") in "Холокост и Еврейское Сопротивление на Оккупированной Территории СССР" ("Holocaust and Jewish Resistance in the Occupied Territory of the USSR"). . Originally on history.pedclub.ru/shoa; page is encoded in Win-1251.
 Romania, Holocaust Encyclopedia, United States Holocaust Memorial Museum. Accessed online 19 December 2006
Alexander Dallin - Odessa, 1941-1944: A Case Study of Soviet Territory Under Foreign Rule
Map
 Igor Niculcea, Rumynskii okkupatsionnyi rezhim v Transnistrii [Romanian occupation of Transnistria], in Записки Iсторичного Факультету, Odessa, Ukraine, 1997, p. 182-187.
 Igor Casu, Istoriografia şi chestiunea Holocaustului: cazul Republicii Moldova [Historiography and the question of Holocaust: The case of Republic of Moldova] (in Romanian) in Contrafort, Chisinau, 11–12, 2006 and 1, 2007 (www.contrafort.md)
 Diana Dumitru, The Use and Abuse of the Holocaust: Historiography and Politics in Moldova, Holocaust and Genocide Studies 2008 22(1):49-73.
 Vladimir Solonaru, "Patterns of Violence: Local Population and the Mass Murder of Jews in Bessarabia and Northern Bukovina, July–August 1941," in Kritika: Explorations in Russian and Eurasian History 8 (4: 2007), 749–787.
 Vladimir Solonaru,"'Model Province': Explaining the Holocaust of Bessarabian and Bukovinian Jewry," Nationalities Papers, Vol. 34, No. 4, September 2006, pp. 471–500.
 Interview with Chava Wolf, a survivor of the camps in Transnistria, in Yad Vashem website.

History of Transnistria
Military history of the Soviet Union
Military history of Romania during World War II
Moldova in World War II
Romanian military occupations
Romania–Soviet Union relations
The Holocaust in Transnistria
Holocaust locations in Ukraine
Holocaust locations in Romania
The Holocaust in Bessarabia and Bukovina
Eastern European theatre of World War II
Governorates of Romania
Subdivisions of Romania
Geography of Romania
History of Odesa Oblast
History of Vinnytsia Oblast
History of Mykolaiv Oblast